Nguyễn Văn Minh Tiến (born 1974) is an electronic worker in Tân Phú ward, Ho Chi Minh City, Vietnam, who acquired notability by catching criminals in Hồ Chí Minh city.

Reportedly he has more than 300 times chased and caught criminals since 1997. Vietnam prime minister Võ Văn Kiệt has called him a "hero in the battle against criminals".

References

People from Ho Chi Minh City
Living people
1974 births